The St. Stephen Aces  were a Canadian junior ice hockey franchise from St. Stephen, New Brunswick. The team was a member of the Maritime Junior Hockey League and played in the Eastlink North Division. They played their home games in the Garcelon Civic Centre in St. Stephen, New Brunswick.

History
The County Aces were founded in 2014 as an expansion team in the Maritime Junior A Hockey League The Aces were part of the Roger Meek (later renamed the EastLink North) Division and were the Maritime Junior A Hockey League's 12th team, bringing balance to the two divisions (6 teams each).

In their first two seasons, the Aces were one of the top draws at the gate despite their on ice struggles.

After playing their last game in the EastLink North Division Semifinal on March 23, 2019, rumours began to swirl around the future of the franchise in St. Stephen. Ownership kept the fans and community waiting to hear about the future of the team, although people in the community (including Mayor Allan MacEachern) felt the future did not look good for the team. On April 10, 2019, a local group came together, with the support of the town council, to try and purchase the team and keep it in St. Stephen. However, by that time an announcement was set for April 15 in Fredericton, and neither the League nor the team responded to the requests for a meeting.

On April 15, the Maritime Junior A Hockey League announced that the St. Stephen Aces had been sold to Global Centre Ice Inc. of Fredericton. The deal had been pitched to the League in March 2019, and the League had voted at that time in favour of the deal. The team was renamed as Fredericton Junior A Red Wings, with plans to begin play at Fredericton's Grant-Harvey Centre in the Fall of 2019.

Season-by-season record

Regular season 

Legend: OTL=Overtime loss, SOL=Shootout loss

Playoffs

External links
 Maritime Junior Hockey League 
 Canadian Junior Hockey League 
 Aces Official

References

Maritime Junior Hockey League teams
Ice hockey teams in New Brunswick
St. Stephen, New Brunswick